Marcel Granollers and Alberto Martín were the defending champions, but Martín chose to not participate.
Granollers decided to participate with Pablo Cuevas, but they lost in the quarterfinals against Simon Greul and Peter Luczak.
Sebastián Prieto and Horacio Zeballos defeated 7–6(7–4), 6–3 Greul and Luczak in the final.

Seeds

Draw

Draws

External links
Main Draw Doubles

Copa Telmex - Doubles
ATP Buenos Aires
2010 Copa Telmex